Stone Turtle is a 2022 Malaysian-Indonesian thriller film directed by Woo Ming Jin, starring  and Bront Palarae.

Cast
  as Zahara
 Bront Palarae as Samad
 Samara Kenzo as Nika
 Amerul Affendi as Registry Officer
 Maisyarah Mazlan as Zahara's sister
 Alison Khor

Release
The film premiered at the 75th Locarno Film Festival on 4 August 2022. It was the first time a Malaysian film had been picked for the festival's main categories. The film won the FIPRESCI Prize at the festival. 

Parallax Films acquired international sales rights to the film in August 2022.

Reception
Matthew Joseph Jenner of the International Cinephile Society rated the film 4 stars out of 5, writing that "By the end of Stone Turtle it is likely that the viewer will leave the film with more questions than answers – in most cases, this would be a shortcoming, since the lack of closure can be frustrating. Yet Woo is gifted enough to use this as a powerful tool, one that stirs as much thought as it causes confusion, which matches the general tone of the film and creates a far more enriching experience than we may have expected at the outset." 

Jessica Kiang of Sight & Sound wrote that "even without much in the way of subtext, the energy given off by the film’s bold engagement with its broad themes of violent patriarchal oppression, tradition colliding with modernity, and ancient folkloric traditions crossbreeding with newer storytelling forms keeps Stone Turtle compelling even when it fails to convince."

References

External links
 

2022 films
2022 thriller films
Malaysian thriller films
Indonesian thriller films
Malay-language films